Rio Casca is a Brazilian municipality located in the state of Minas Gerais. The city belongs to the mesoregion of Zona da Mata and to the microregion of Ponte Nova. As of 2020, the population was 13,473 in a total area of 384 km².

See also
 List of municipalities in Minas Gerais

References

Municipalities in Minas Gerais